Bella Murekatete (born 4 July 2000) is a Rwandan college basketball player for the Washington State Cougars and the Rwanda national team. She is believed to be the first Rwandan-born player in NCAA Division I women's basketball history. She was named the 2022 Pac-12 Conference co-Most Improved Player of the Year after averaging 10.3 points, 7.3 rebounds, and 1.7 blocks per game.

Early years
Murekatete grew up playing football and volleyball in her native Rwanda before discovering basketball. She moved to Post Falls, Idaho on an F-1 visa at the age of 14 to play the sport at Genesis Prep Academy. Murekatete was a three-time first-team all-state selection. She also played with North Idaho Elite on the Amateur Athletic Union (AAU) circuit. In November 2018, Murekatete signed a letter of intent to play at Washington State.

National team career
Murekatete represented Rwanda at the 2015 FIBA Africa Under-16 Championship for Women, where she averaged 14.3 points and a tournament-best 22 rebounds per game and earned all-tournament honors. She notably recorded 24 points and 37 rebounds in a loss to Tunisia.

Murekatete represented Rwanda at the 2018 FIBA U18 Women's African Championship, where she averaged 16.8 points, 13.7 rebounds and 1.7 assists per game and earned all-tournament honors after leading her team to a fourth-place finish.

Murekatete made her debut with the senior national team in a 2023 Women's Afrobasket qualifier.

References

External links
 Washington State Cougars bio
 FIBA profile
 Bella Murekatete at AfroBasket.com

Living people
2000 births
Rwandan basketball players
APR B.C. players
Washington State Cougars women's basketball players
Rwandan expatriate sportspeople in the United States